Kevin James Matthews (born February 4, 1987) is a former American football center who played in the National Football League (NFL) for the Tennessee Titans and the Carolina Panthers. He played college football at Texas A&M University.

Early years
Matthews attended Elkins High School, where he received All-District honors in his last two years. He was named to the 2005 All-Greater Houston football team. He also practiced the shot put.

He accepted a scholarship from Texas A&M University, becoming a starter at center as a junior. He finished his college career with 34 games and 25 straight starts.

Professional career

Tennessee Titans (first stint)
Matthews was signed by the Tennessee Titans as an undrafted free agent following the 2010 NFL Draft on April 30.  He was waived during final cuts on September 4, but was re-signed to the team's practice squad the next day. He was promoted to the active roster on December 15, after center Eugene Amano was placed on the injured reserve list due to a neck injury and started the last game of the season against the Indianapolis Colts. The next year, 2011, he was declared inactive for 15 games. 

In 2013, he appeared in 14 games (2 starts), before being lost for the year with a high ankle sprain injury, suffered in the week 15 game against the New York Jets.

Washington Redskins
On May 7, 2013, Matthews signed as a free agent with the Washington Redskins. He did not make the final roster and was cut on the last day of training camp on August 30.

Tennessee Titans (second stint)
On November 12, 2013, Matthews was re-signed by the Tennessee Titans. Throughout November and December, he was waived and re-signed on two occasions.

Carolina Panthers
On July 23, 2014, he was signed by the Carolina Panthers. On August 26, he was placed on the injured reserve list with a right shoulder injury, that he suffered during a preseason practice.

Personal life

Kevin's father, Bruce Matthews, is a Hall of Fame offensive lineman who played for the Houston / Tennessee Oilers / Titans from 1983–2001. Kevin's uncle, Clay Matthews, Jr., is a former four-time Pro Bowl linebacker who played for the Cleveland Browns and Atlanta Falcons from 1978–1996. Kevin's grandfather, Clay Matthews, Sr., is a former offensive tackle and linebacker who played for the San Francisco 49ers for four seasons during the 1950s. Kevin's younger brother, Jake Matthews, is an offensive tackle for the Atlanta Falcons. Kevin's cousins, Clay Matthews III was a linebacker for the Green Bay Packers, and Casey Matthews, was a linebacker in the National Football League. Kevin also has a younger brother Mike, who is a center that was signed as an undrafted free agent by the Cleveland Browns.

References

External links
 Tennessee Titans bio 
 Carolina Panthers bio 

1987 births
Living people
Players of American football from Texas
American football centers
Texas A&M Aggies football players
Tennessee Titans players
Washington Redskins players
Carolina Panthers players
Matthews football family